Gretchen Peters (born November 14, 1957) is an American singer and songwriter. She was born in New York, where she wrote her first song with her sister at the age of 5. In 1970, her parents broke up, and Peters moved with her mother to Boulder, Colorado. There, she discovered a lively music scene, and began playing at local clubs.In 1988 she moved to Nashville., where she found work as a songwriter, composing hits for Martina McBride, Etta James, Trisha Yearwood, Patty Loveless, George Strait, Anne Murray, Shania Twain, Neil Diamond and co-writing songs with Bryan Adams. Some of Peters' notable compositions include "The Secret of Life", "On a Bus to St. Cloud", "You Don't Even Know Who I Am" and "Independence Day", for which she received the Country Music Association Award for Song of the Year. In addition, Peters has released fourteen studio albums of her own, beginning with 1996's The Secret of Life.

As a writer, Peters' style is defined by melancholy lyrics and dark themes, such as murder, loneliness, PTSD, sexual abuse, domestic violence. She was inducted to the Nashville Songwriters Hall of Fame on October 5, 2014. On August 12, 2022, Peters announced her intention to retire from touring, playing her final shows in June 2023, though she will continue to write and record.

Discography

Albums

Singles

Guest singles

Music videos

Awards and nominations

References

External links
Official Web Site

American women country singers
American country singer-songwriters
American people of Dutch descent
Living people
1957 births
People from Bronxville, New York
Imprint Records artists
Country musicians from New York (state)
21st-century American women
Singer-songwriters from New York (state)